Qazvin's codes are 79 and 89. In public cars, Taxis and Governal cars the letter is always the same. But in simple cars this letter (ب) depends on the city.

79 
79 is Qazvin county and Alborz County's code and all of the letters are for Qazvin.

89 

Road transport in Iran
Transportation in Qazvin Province